Syzygium xerampelinum, known as the Mulgrave satinash, is a rare rainforest tree of tropical Queensland, Australia. The bark and fruit are similar to the often cultivated magenta cherry.

References

 

xerampelinum
Myrtales of Australia
Flora of Queensland
Ornamental trees
Trees of Australia
Taxa named by Bernard Hyland